Karasuk (Qarasuyq) is a town and the administrative center of Karasuksky District in Novosibirsk Oblast, Russia, located on the Karasuk River  west of Novosibirsk, the administrative center of the oblast. Population:

History
It was founded in the late 18th century and was granted town status in 1954.

Administrative and municipal status
Within the framework of administrative divisions, Karasuk serves as the administrative center of Karasuksky District. As an administrative division, it is, together with the settlement of Yarok, incorporated within Karasuksky District as the Town of Karasuk. As a municipal division, the Town of Karasuk is incorporated within Karasuksky Municipal District as Karasuk Urban Settlement.

Notable residents 

Sergey Zhunenko (born 1970 in Karasuk), former Kazakhstani footballer

References

Notes

Sources

External links

Official website of Karasuk 
Karasuk Business Directory  

Cities and towns in Novosibirsk Oblast